East Belitung Regency (Kabupaten Belitung Timur) is a regency (kabupaten) of Bangka Belitung Islands Province, Indonesia, encompassing the eastern half of Belitung Island. It covers an area of 2,506.91 km2 (including 141 offshore islands) and had a population of 106,463 at the 2010 Census and 127,018 at the 2020 Census. Its regency seat is the town of Manggar.

Administrative Districts
The Regency is administratively divided into seven districts (kecamatan), tabulated below with their areas and their 2010 Census  and 2020 Census populations. The table also includes the number of administrative villages (rural desa and urban kelurahan) and the number of offshore islands in each district, and its postal codes.

References

Regencies of Bangka Belitung Islands